The women's 52 kg sambo event at the 2019 European Games in Minsk was held on 23 June at the Minsk Sports Palace.

Results
Legend

 E3 – Contestant's elimination by the doctor's
 VS – Total victory by decisive superiority
 VH – Total victory – painful hold

Repechage

References

External links
Draw Sheet

Women's 52 kg